John Kelly (born 2 February 1960) is a former Irish Labour Party politician who has served as a Senator for the Administrative Panel from 2011 to 2016.

He was previously a member of Roscommon County Council, having been elected in 2004 as an Independent candidate for the Ballaghaderreen local electoral area. He stood as an independent for the Roscommon–South Leitrim constituency at the 2007 general election but was not elected. He was re-elected as an independent to Roscommon County Council in 2009, this time for the Castlerea local electoral area.

He joined the Labour Party in February 2010 and was the party candidate for Roscommon–South Leitrim at the 2011 general election but was not elected. He was the Labour Party Seanad Spokesperson on Arts, Heritage, Gaeltacht Affairs, Training and Skills.

Following County Roscommon border disputes in 2016, Kelly did not seek re-election.

References

1960 births
Living people
Politicians from County Roscommon
Members of the 24th Seanad
Labour Party (Ireland) senators
Independent politicians in Ireland
Local councillors in County Roscommon